Ullin is a village in Pulaski County, Illinois, United States. The population was 463 at the 2010 census.

History

Ullin was established as a site along the Illinois Central Railroad in the mid-1850s. Some sources suggest it was named for a Gaelic folk hero who frequently appears in the works of the poet Ossian.  Other sources suggest it was named for its first postmaster, Samuel Ulen.  A post office was established in 1856, and the village was platted the following year. Ullin incorporated in 1900.

Geography
Ullin is located at  (37.277861, -89.181533).  The village is situated along the Cache River north of Cairo. The Cypress Creek National Wildlife Refuge lies to the east of Ullin. Interstate 57 passes along the village's eastern border.

Demographics

As of the census of 2000, there were 779 people, 247 households, and 145 families residing in the village. The racial makeup of the village was 57.25% White, 31.84% African American, 7.57% Asian, 0.51% from other races, and 2.82% from two or more races. Hispanic or Latino of any race were 5.91% of the population.

There were 247 households, out of which 30.8% had children under the age of 18 living with them, 37.2% were married couples living together, 15.8% had a female householder with no husband present, and 40.9% were non-families. 38.9% of all households were made up of individuals, and 27.1% had someone living alone who was 65 years of age or older. The average household size was 2.21 and the average family size was 2.97.

In the village, the population was spread out, with 24.1% under the age of 18, 10.5% from 18 to 24, 32.6% from 25 to 44, 17.3% from 45 to 64, and 15.4% who were 65 years of age or older. The median age was 36 years. For every 100 females, there were 129.1 males. For every 100 females age 18 and over, there were 139.3 males.

The median income for a household in the village was $20,000, and the median income for a family was $31,979. Males had a median income of $29,049 versus $21,607 for females. The per capita income for the village was $12,789. About 9.8% of families and 16.8% of the population were below the poverty line, including 11.6% of those under age 18 and 25.4% of those age 65 or over.

See also
Illinois Central Railroad Depot (Ullin, Illinois)
Century High School (Ullin, Illinois)

References

External links

 
Villages in Pulaski County, Illinois
Villages in Illinois